Atilla Birlik (born 27 November 1977) is a German-Turkish former professional footballer who played as a forward.

His career was based in Germany and Turkey, playing for Waldhof Mannheim, Antalyaspor, Greuther Fürth Malatyaspor, Gençlerbirliği, Diyarbakirspor and Sivasspor.

References

External links
 

1977 births
Living people
Sportspeople from Ludwigshafen
German people of Turkish descent
German footballers
Footballers from Rhineland-Palatinate
Association football forwards
2. Bundesliga players
Süper Lig players
SV Waldhof Mannheim players
Antalyaspor footballers
Malatyaspor footballers
SpVgg Greuther Fürth players
Gençlerbirliği S.K. footballers
Diyarbakırspor footballers
Sivasspor footballers
German expatriate footballers
German expatriate sportspeople in Turkey
Expatriate footballers in Turkey